August Wilhelm Malm (23 July 1821  – 5 March 1882) was a Swedish zoologist, entomologist and malacologist.
He was the first Director of the Gothenburg Natural History Museum.

Biography
August Wilhelm Malm was born   in Lund, Sweden.
Malm was generally self-taught without an academic degree.  In the years 1838–1839, he was student and assistant of Sven Nilsson (1787–1883), professor of Natural History at Lund University.
He worked from 1840 as an assistant of Carl Jakob Sundevall (1801–1875) at the Swedish Museum of Natural History, zoological department in Stockholm. He studied zoology  in Copenhagen during 1843–44. 

From 1848, he was curator of the Gothenburg Natural History Museum (Göteborgs Naturhistoriska Museum).
From 1852, he was a teacher of zoology at Gothenburg high school.
From 1856-67, he is also the supervisor of Gothenburg and Bohus County Fisheries.

When the Gothenburg Museum was founded in 1861, the founding group included  August Malm together with newspaper publisher Sven Adolf Hedlund  (1821–1900) and architect  Victor von Gegerfelt   (1817-1915). In 1862,  Gothenburg Natural History Museum was incorporated into the Gothenburg Museum.

Selected works
1855 - Om Svenska landt- och söttvattens mollusker, med särskilt afseende på de arter och former, som förkomma i grannskapet af Christianstad (C) och Göteborg (G) 
1866 - Om den i Bohuslän strandade hvalen
1866 - Några blad om hvaldjur i allmänhet och Balænoptera Carolinæ i synnerhet
 1871 -   Hvaldjur i Sveriges museer, år 1869  
 1877 - Göteborg och Bohusläns fauna, Ryggradsdjvren

References

Other sources
Göteborgs etnografiska museum (Göteborg:  Årstryck. 1983)
 Grönberg, Cecilia; Magnusson, Jonas   Leviatan från Göteborg  (Göteborg: Glänta. 2002 )

External links
 Cotebleue Portrait
Göteborgs Naturhistoriska Museum website

1821 births
1882 deaths
Swedish entomologists
Swedish malacologists
19th-century Swedish zoologists
People from Gothenburg